Hwanung (Korean for the "Supreme Divine Regent") is an important figure in the mythological origins of Korea. He plays a central role in the story of Dangun Wanggeom (단군왕검/), the legendary founder of Gojoseon, the first kingdom of Korea.  Hwanung is the son of Hwanin (환인), the "Lord of Heaven". Along with his ministers of clouds, rain, and wind, he instituted laws and moral codes and taught the humans various arts, medicine, and agriculture.

Creation myth
According to the Dangun creation myth, Hwanung yearned to live on the earth among the valleys and the mountains. Hwanin permitted Hwanung and 3000 followers to depart and they descended from heaven to a sandalwood tree on Baekdu Mountain, then called Taebaek Mountain (태백산/).  There Hwanung founded Sinsi (신시/, "City of God") and gave himself the title Heaven King. In a cave near the sandalwood tree lived a bear and a tiger who came to the tree every day to pray to Hwanung. One day Hwanung gave the bear and the tiger twenty bulbs of garlic and some divine mugwort.  Hwanung promised if they ate only his garlic and mugwort and stayed in the cave out of the sunlight for one hundred days he would make them human.

The tiger and the bear agreed and went back to the cave, but tiger was too hungry and impatient to wait, leaving the cave before the 100 days were done.  But the bear remained, and on the 21st day was transformed into a beautiful woman, who gratefully honored Hwanung with offerings.  With time the woman grew lonely, and prayed to Hwanung that she might have a child.  So Hwanung made her his wife and gave her a son called Dangun, a name which has two meanings: "Altar Prince" and sandalwood.  Dangun eventually founded Gojoseon.

Kingdom of Sinsi-Baedal 
In the pseudo-historic book Hwandan Gogi (환단고기/ Hanja: 桓檀古記) described Gojoseon to have existed and formed in Hwan-guk (환국/  Hanja: 桓國, "Kingdom of Hwan") and Baedal-guk (배달국/ Hanja: 倍達國, "Kingdom of Baedal": later known as Sinsi 신시/ Hanja: 神市, "City of the Gods"). It is said that both nations were ruled by Hwan-in and Hwan-ung, each spanning from 7 rulers and 18 rulers respectively. The descriptions are generally accepted as fabrications in the modern era by mainstream historians.

There are descriptions on both the books of "Sinsi Yeokdaegi" (신시역대기/ Hanja: 神市歷代紀, "Era of the Dynasty of Sinsi") in the Samseonggi (삼성기/ Hanja: 三聖紀, "Period of the Sacred Three" - i.e. Hwanin, Hwanung and Dangun) and the "Sinsi Bon-gi" (신시본기/ Hanja: 神市本紀 "Period of Sinsi") in the Taebaek Il-sa (태백일사/ Hanja: 太白逸史, "History of Taebaek"), about the kingdom of Sinsi-Baedal where Dangun transferred the Korean people in the Kingdom of Gojoseon in Manchuria to establish the nation mainly at the centre of the Korean Peninsula. The kingdom of 18 descendants of Hwan-ung are claimed to have ruled the nation for 1565 years in the annals of these books, as well as the featuring one of emperors, Chiyou (Hangul: 치우; Hanzi: 蚩尤) which has been traced from Chinese Mythology on record.

The following rulers of the Sinsi-Baedal, are claimed to be dominantly ancient Korean in nature:

Popular culture
 Portrayed by Bae Yong-joon in the 2007 MBC TV series The Legend.

See also

 Dangun
 Hwanin
 Gojoseon

References

Citations

Bibliography
 
 

Creation myths
Korean gods
Korean mythology
Dangun
Gojoseon